Live in Sydney refers to a Kylie Minogue DVD

Live in Sydney may also refer to:
Live in Sydney, DVD by André Rieu 2009
Live in Sydney, DVD by Culture Club 1984
Live in Sydney, DVD by Roxette 1991
Live in Sydney, DVD by Living Loud 2010
Live in Sydney, DVD by Arlo Guthrie 2012
Live in Sydney, DVD by Michael Franti and Spearhead
Live in Sydney, DVD by k.d. lang